Federally recognized tribes are those Native American tribes recognized by the United States Bureau of Indian Affairs for certain federal government purposes. For Alaska Native tribes, see list of Alaska Native tribal entities. , 574 Indian tribes were legally recognized by the Bureau of Indian Affairs (BIA) of the United States. Of these, 231 are located in Alaska.

Description
In the United States, the Native American tribe is a fundamental unit of sovereign tribal government, and the constitution grants to the U.S. Congress the right to interact with tribes. More specifically, the Supreme Court of the United States in United States v. Sandoval (231 US. 28 [1913]) warned, "it is not ... that Congress may bring a community or body of people within range of this power by arbitrarily calling them an Indian tribe, but only that in respect of distinctly Indian communities the questions whether, to what extent, and for what time they shall be recognized and dealt with as dependent tribes" (at 46). Federal tribal recognition grants to tribes the right to self-government, as well as certain benefits. The recognition process is largely controlled by the United States federal agency the Bureau of Indian Affairs, in consultation with federally recognized tribes.

In January 2015 the United States' Federal Register issued an official list of 566 tribes that are Indian Entities Recognized and Eligible To Receive Services From the United States Bureau of Indian Affairs. The number of tribes increased to 567 in July 2015 with the federal recognition of the Pamunkey tribe in Virginia. USA.gov, the federal government's official web portal, maintains a list of tribal governments which is constantly updated. Ancillary information present in former versions of this list but no longer contained in the current listing have been included here in italics print.

In 2018, six more Virginia-based tribes were added to the list, then in 2020 the Little Shell Chippewa were recognized bringing the total to 574. Of these, 231 are located in Alaska.

Alabama 
 Poarch Band of Creeks(previously listed as Poarch Band of Creek Indians of Alabama)(previously listed as Creek Nation East of the Mississippi)

Alaska

Arizona 

Multiple states:
 Colorado River Indian Tribes of the Colorado River Indian Reservation, Arizona and California
 Fort Mojave Indian Tribe of Arizona, California & Nevada
 Navajo Nation, Arizona, New Mexico & Utah
 Quechan Tribe of the Fort Yuma Indian Reservation, California & Arizona
 Zuni Tribe of the Zuni Reservation, New Mexico

Arkansas 
No federally recognized tribes

California 
{{collist | 
 Agua Caliente Band of Cahuilla Indians of the Agua Caliente Indian Reservation, California
 Alturas Indian Rancheria, California
 Augustine Band of Cahuilla Indians, California(formerly the Augustine Band of Cahuilla Mission Indians of the Augustine Reservation, California)
 Bear River Band of the Rohnerville Rancheria, California
 Berry Creek Rancheria of Maidu Indians of California
 Big Lagoon Rancheria, California
 Big Pine Band of Owens Valley Paiute Shoshone Indians of the Big Pine Reservation, California
 Big Sandy Rancheria of Mono Indians of California
 Big Valley Band of Pomo Indians of the Big Valley Rancheria, California
 Blue Lake Rancheria, California
 Bridgeport Paiute Indian Colony of California
 Buena Vista Rancheria of Me-Wuk Indians of California
 Cabazon Band of Cahuilla Indians(previously listed as Cabazon Band of Mission Indians, California; Cabazon Band of Cahuilla Mission Indians of the Cabazon Reservation)
 Cachil DeHe Band of Wintun Indians of the Colusa Indian Community of the Colusa Rancheria, California
 Cahto Indian Tribe of the Laytonville Rancheria, California
 Cahuilla Band of Mission Indians of the Cahuilla Reservation, California
 California Valley Miwok Tribe, California(formerly the Sheep Ranch Rancheria of Me-Wuk Indians of California)
 Campo Band of Diegueno Mission Indians of the Campo Indian Reservation, California
 Capitan Grande Band of Diegueno Mission Indians of California:
 Barona Group of Capitan Grande Band of Mission Indians of the Barona Reservation, California
 Viejas (Baron Long) Group of Capitan Grande Band of Mission Indians of the Viejas Reservation, California
 Cedarville Rancheria, California
 Chemehuevi Indian Tribe of the Chemehuevi Reservation, California
 Cher-Ae Heights Indian Community of the Trinidad Rancheria, California
 Chicken Ranch Rancheria of Me-Wuk Indians of California
 Cloverdale Rancheria of Pomo Indians of California
 Cold Springs Rancheria of Mono Indians of California
 Cortina Indian Rancheria of Wintun Indians of California
 Coyote Valley Band of Pomo Indians of California
 Death Valley Timbi-Sha Shoshone Band of California
 Dry Creek Rancheria of Pomo Indians of California
 Elem Indian Colony of Pomo Indians of the Sulphur Bank Rancheria, California
 Elk Valley Rancheria, California
 Enterprise Rancheria of Maidu Indians of California
 Ewiiaapaayp Band of Kumeyaay Indians, California(formerly the Cuyapaipe Community of Diegueno Mission Indians of the Cuyapaipe Reservation)
 Federated Indians of Graton Rancheria, California(formerly the Graton Rancheria)(formerly the Federated Coast Miwok)
 Fort Bidwell Indian Community of the Fort Bidwell Reservation of California
 Fort Independence Indian Community of Paiute Indians of the Fort Independence Reservation, California
 Greenville Rancheria of Maidu Indians of California
 Grindstone Indian Rancheria of Wintun-Wailaki Indians of California
 Guidiville Rancheria of California
 Habematolel Pomo of Upper Lake, California(formerly the Upper Lake Band of Pomo Indians of Upper Lake Rancheria of California)
 Hoopa Valley Tribe, California
 Hopland Band of Pomo Indians of the Hopland Rancheria, California
 Inaja Band of Diegueno Mission Indians of the Inaja and Cosmit Reservation, California
 Ione Band of Miwok Indians of California
 Jackson Rancheria of Me-Wuk Indians of California
 Jamul Indian Village of California
 Karuk Tribe of California
 Kashia Band of Pomo Indians of the Stewarts Point Rancheria, California
 Kletsel Dehe Wintun Nation of the Cortina Rancheria(previously listed as Kletsel Dehe Band of Wintun Indians) 
 Koi Nation of Northern California(previously listed as Koi Nation)
 La Jolla Band of Luiseno Mission Indians of the La Jolla Reservation, California
 La Posta Band of Diegueno Mission Indians of the La Posta Indian Reservation, California
 Los Coyotes Band of Cahuilla & Cupeno Indians of the Los Coyotes Reservation, California(formerly the Los Coyotes Band of Cahuilla Mission Indians of the Los Coyotes Reservation)
 Lytton Rancheria of California
 Manchester Band of Pomo Indians of the Manchester Rancheria, California(previously listed as Manchester Band of Pomo Indians of the Manchester-Point Arena Rancheria, California)
 Manzanita Band of Diegueno Mission Indians of the Manzanita Reservation, California
 Mechoopda Indian Tribe of Chico Rancheria, California
 Mesa Grande Band of Diegueno Mission Indians of the Mesa Grande Reservation, California
 Middletown Rancheria of Pomo Indians of California
 Mooretown Rancheria of Maidu Indians of California
 Morongo Band of Cahuilla Mission Indians of the Morongo Reservation, California
 Northfork Rancheria of Mono Indians of California
 Paiute-Shoshone Indians of the Bishop Community of the Bishop Colony, California
 Paiute-Shoshone Indians of the Lone Pine Community of the Lone Pine Reservation, California
 Pala Band of Luiseno Mission Indians of the Pala Reservation, California
 Paskenta Band of Nomlaki Indians of California
 Pauma Band of Luiseno Mission Indians of the Pauma & Yuima Reservation, California
 Pechanga Band of Indians(previously listed as Pechanga Band of Luiseno Mission Indians of the Pechanga Reservation, California
 Picayune Rancheria of Chukchansi Indians of California
 Pinoleville Pomo Nation, California(formerly the Pinoleville Rancheria of Pomo Indians of California)
 Pit River Tribe, Californiaincludes:
 XL Ranch
 Big Bend Rancheria
 Likely Rancheria
 Lookout Rancheria
 Montgomery Creek Rancheria
 Roaring Creek Rancheria
 Potter Valley Tribe, California(formerly the Potter Valley Rancheria of Pomo Indians of California)
 Quartz Valley Indian Community of the Quartz Valley Reservation of California
 Ramona Band or Village of Cahuilla Mission Indians of California
 Redding Rancheria, California
 Redwood Valley Rancheria of Pomo Indians of California
 Resighini Rancheria, California(formerly the Coast Indian Community of Yurok Indians of the Resighini Rancheria)
 Rincon Band of Luiseno Indians(previously listed as Rincon Band of Luiseno Mission Indians of Rincon Reservation, California)
 Robinson Rancheria of Pomo Indians of California
 Round Valley Indian Tribes of the Round Valley Reservation, California(formerly the Covelo Indian Community)
 Rumsey Indian Rancheria of Wintun Indians of California
 San Pasqual Band of Diegueno Mission Indians of California
 Santa Rosa Band of Cahuilla Indians, California(formerly the Santa Rosa Band of Cahuilla Mission Indians of the Santa Rosa Reservation)
 Santa Rosa Indian Community of the Santa Rosa Rancheria, California
 Santa Ynez Band of Chumash Mission Indians of the Santa Ynez Reservation, California
 Santa Ysabel Band of Diegueno Mission Indians of the Santa Ysabel Reservation, California
 Scotts Valley Band of Pomo Indians of California
 Sherwood Valley Rancheria of Pomo Indians of California
 Shingle Springs Band of Miwok Indians, Shingle Springs Rancheria (Verona Tract), California
 Smith River Rancheria, California
 Soboba Band of Luiseno Indians, California(formerly the Soboba Band of Luiseno Mission Indians of the Soboba Reservation)
 Susanville Indian Rancheria, California
 Sycuan Band of the Kumeyaay Nation(formerly the Sycuan Band of Diegueno Mission Indians of California)
 Table Mountain Rancheria of California
 Tejon Indian Tribe
 Torres Martinez Desert Cahuilla Indians, California(formerly the Torres-Martinez Band of Cahuilla Mission Indians of California)
 Tule River Indian Tribe of the Tule River Reservation, California
 Tuolumne Band of Me-Wuk Indians of the Tuolumne Rancheria of California
 Twenty-Nine Palms Band of Mission Indians of California
 United Auburn Indian Community of the Auburn Rancheria of California
 Utu Utu Gwaitu Paiute Tribe of the Benton Paiute Reservation, California
 Wilton Rancheria
 Wiyot Tribe, California(formerly the Table Bluff Reservation—Wiyot Tribe)
 Yuhaaviatam of San Manuel Nation(previously listed as San Manuel Band of Mission Indians, California; San Manuel Band of Serrano Mission Indians of the San Manuel Reservation, California)
 Yurok Tribe of the Yurok Reservation, California
}}

Multiple states:
 Colorado River Indian Tribes of the Colorado River Indian Reservation, Arizona and California
 Fort Mojave Indian Tribe of Arizona, California & Nevada
 Quechan Tribe of the Fort Yuma Indian Reservation, California & Arizona
 Washoe Tribe of Nevada & California
 Carson Colony
 Dresslerville Colony
 Woodfords Community
 Stewart Community
 Washoe Ranches

 Colorado 
 Southern Ute Indian Tribe of the Southern Ute Reservation, Colorado

Multiple states:
 Ute Mountain Tribe of the Ute Mountain Reservation, Colorado, New Mexico & Utah

 Connecticut 
 Mashantucket Pequot Tribe of Connecticut
 Mohegan Indian Tribe of Connecticut

 Delaware No federally recognized tribes Florida 
 Miccosukee Tribe of Indians of Florida
 Seminole Tribe of Florida
 Big Cypress Reservation
 Brighton Reservation
 Hollywood Reservation
 Tampa Reservation

 Georgia No federally recognized tribes Hawaii No federally recognized tribes Idaho 
 Coeur D'Alene Tribe of the Coeur D'Alene Reservation, Idaho
 Kootenai Tribe of Idaho
 Nez Perce Tribe of Idaho
 Shoshone-Bannock Tribes of the Fort Hall Reservation of Idaho

Multiple states:
 Shoshone-Paiute Tribes of the Duck Valley Reservation, Idaho and Nevada

 Illinois No federally recognized tribes Indiana 
Multiple states:
 Pokagon Band of Potawatomi Indians, Michigan and Indiana

 Iowa 
 Sac & Fox Tribe of the Mississippi in Iowa

 Kansas 
 Kickapoo Tribe of Indians of the Kickapoo Reservation in Kansas
 Prairie Band of Potawatomi Nation, Kansas(formerly the Prairie Band of Potawatomi Indians)

Multiple states:
 Iowa Tribe of Kansas and Nebraska
 Sac & Fox Nation of Missouri in Kansas and Nebraska

 Kentucky No federally recognized tribes Louisiana 
 Chitimacha Tribe of Louisiana
 Coushatta Tribe of Louisiana
 Jena Band of Choctaw Indians, Louisiana
 Tunica-Biloxi Indian Tribe of Louisiana

 Maine 
 Houlton Band of Maliseet Indians(formerly Houlton Band of Maliseet Indians of Maine) Mi'kmaq Nation(previously listed as Aroostook Band of Micmacs; Aroostook Band of Micmac Indians)
 Passamaquoddy Tribe(formerly Passamaquoddy Tribe of Maine) Penobscot Nation(formerly Penobscot Tribe of Maine) Maryland No federally recognized tribes Massachusetts 
 Mashpee Wampanoag Tribe, Massachusetts
 Wampanoag Tribe of Gay Head (Aquinnah) of Massachusetts(formerly Wampanoag Tribal Council of Gay Head, Inc.)

 Michigan 

Multiple states:
 Pokagon Band of Potawatomi Indians, Michigan and Indiana

 Minnesota 
 Lower Sioux Indian Community in the State of Minnesota
 Prairie Island Indian Community in the State of Minnesota
 Red Lake Band of Chippewa Indians, Minnesota
 Shakopee Mdewakanton Sioux Community of Minnesota
 Upper Sioux Community, Minnesota

Multiple states:
 Ho-Chunk Nation of Wisconsin (also in Minnesota)(formerly the Wisconsin Winnebago Tribe)
 Minnesota Chippewa Tribe, MinnesotaSix component reservations:
 Bois Forte Band (Nett Lake)
 Fond du Lac Band (also in Wisconsin)
 Grand Portage Band
 Leech Lake Band
 Mille Lacs Band
 White Earth Band

 Mississippi 
Multiple states:
 Mississippi Band of Choctaw Indians

 Missouri No federally recognized tribes Montana 

Multiple states:
 Turtle Mountain Band of Chippewa Indians of North Dakota (also in Montana and South Dakota)

 Nebraska 
 Omaha Tribe of Nebraska
 Ponca Tribe of Nebraska
 Santee Sioux Nation, Nebraska(formerly the Santee Sioux Tribe of the Santee Reservation of Nebraska)
 Winnebago Tribe of Nebraska

Multiple states:
 Iowa Tribe of Kansas and Nebraska
 Sac & Fox Nation of Missouri in Kansas and Nebraska

 Nevada 

Multiple states:
 Confederated Tribes of the Goshute Reservation, Nevada and Utah
 Fort McDermitt Paiute and Shoshone Tribes of the Fort McDermitt Indian Reservation, Nevada and Oregon
 Fort Mojave Indian Tribe of Arizona, California & Nevada
 Shoshone-Paiute Tribes of the Duck Valley Reservation, Idaho and Nevada
 Washoe Tribe of Nevada & California
 Carson Colony
 Dresslerville Colony
 Woodfords Community
 Stewart Community
 Washoe Ranches

 New Hampshire No federally recognized tribes New Jersey No federally recognized tribes New Mexico 

Multiple states:
 Fort Sill Apache Tribe (also Oklahoma)
 Navajo Nation, Arizona, New Mexico & Utah
 Ute Mountain Tribe of the Ute Mountain Reservation, Colorado, New Mexico & Utah
 Zuni Tribe of the Zuni Reservation, New Mexico (also Arizona)

 New York 

 North Carolina 
 Eastern Band of Cherokee Indians(previously listed as Eastern Band of Cherokee Indians of North Carolina) North Dakota 
 Spirit Lake Tribe, North Dakota
 Three Affiliated Tribes of the Fort Berthold Reservation, North Dakota

Multiple states:
 Standing Rock Sioux Tribe of North & South Dakota
 Turtle Mountain Band of Chippewa Indians of North Dakota (also in Montana and South Dakota)

 Ohio No federally recognized tribes Oklahoma 

 Oregon 

Multiple states:
 Fort McDermitt Paiute and Shoshone Tribe

 Pennsylvania No federally recognized tribes Rhode Island 
 Narragansett Indian Tribe of Rhode Island

 South Carolina 
 Catawba Indian Nation(aka Catawba Tribe of South Carolina)

South Dakota

Multiple states:
 Standing Rock Sioux Tribe of North & South Dakota
 Turtle Mountain Band of Chippewa Indians of North Dakota (also in Montana and South Dakota)

 Tennessee 
Multiple states:
 Mississippi Band of Choctaw Indians

 Texas 

 Alabama-Coushatta Tribes of Texas
 Kickapoo Traditional Tribe of Texas(formerly the Texas Band of Traditional Kickapoo) Ysleta Del Sur Pueblo of Texas

 Utah 
 Northwestern Band of Shoshoni Nation of Utah (Washakie)
 Paiute Indian Tribe of Utah
 Cedar City Band of Paiutes
 Kanosh Band of Paiutes
 Koosharem Band of Paiutes
 Indian Peaks Band of Paiutes
 Shivwits Band of Paiutes
 Skull Valley Band of Goshute Indians of Utah
 Ute Indian Tribe of the Uintah & Ouray Reservation, Utah

Multiple states:
 Confederated Tribes of the Goshute Reservation, Nevada and Utah
 Navajo Nation, Arizona, New Mexico & Utah
 Ute Mountain Tribe of the Ute Mountain Reservation, Colorado, New Mexico & Utah

 Vermont No federally recognized tribesVirginia

 Washington 

 West Virginia No federally recognized tribes Wisconsin 

Multiple states:
 Ho-Chunk Nation of Wisconsin (also in Minnesota)(formerly the Wisconsin Winnebago Tribe'')
 Minnesota Chippewa Tribe, Minnesota
 Fond du Lac Band (also in Wisconsin)

Wyoming 
 Arapahoe Tribe of the Wind River Reservation, Wyoming
 Shoshone Tribe of the Wind River Reservation, Wyoming

See also
 Classification of indigenous peoples of the Americas

United States
 Federally recognized tribes, continental United States
 List of Alaska Native tribal entities
 List of Indian reservations in the United States
 List of historical Indian reservations in the United States
 Native Americans in the United States
 State recognized tribes in the United States
 Unrecognized tribes in the United States

Aboriginal peoples in Canada
 List of Indian reserves in Canada
 List of First Nations governments
 List of First Nations peoples
 Inuit
 Métis

References

Native American history
Native American-related lists
Federally recognized tribes by state